Josipa Rimac (born 25 February 1980) is a Croatian politician who served as Mayor of Knin in three terms between 2005 and 2015. She was a member of the main centre-right Croatian Democratic Union party. Rimac was elected mayor in June 2005 at age 25, making her the youngest mayor in the country since independence in 1991.

Born in Lukar (part of Promina municipality), Rimac spending her first four years of schooling in Knin, until the Croatian War of Independence broke out in the 1990s. She then went to school in Rijeka and Split, and returned to Knin in October 1995, when the fighting stopped. Rimac studied at the school of economics where she also learned English. She also spent a lot of time volunteering for the local Red Cross in Knin, and in 2000 was named director of the Red Cross in the city of Knin, being the youngest director in the country. In 2005 Rimac was promoted to director of the Red Cross in Šibenik-Knin County (all of which was volunteer work). She has been involved with politics since school, and became a member of the Croatian Democratic Union. On 10 June 2005, she was elected mayor of Knin. In September 2015, Rimac submitted her resignation to the position of mayor of Knin so she could "participate in the HDZ election campaign for the 2015 parliamentary election."

On 25 September 2015, Croatian Parliament unanimously and without debate took away Rimac's parliamentary immunity thereby allowing the State Attorney's Office (DORH) to continue the investigation against her for suspected illegally acquiring apartment and damaging the state budget for more than 500,000 Croatian kunas while she served as mayor.

In May 2020, Rimac was taken into police custody under charges of corruption.

Rimac is married with a daughter Katja (born c. 2002).

References

 Josipa Rimac 

1980 births
Living people
People from Promina, Croatia
Croatian Democratic Union politicians
Mayors of Knin
Women mayors of places in Croatia
Representatives in the modern Croatian Parliament